Clobetasone butyrate is a synthetic glucocorticoid corticosteroid and a corticosteroid ester.

References

Butyrate esters
Corticosteroid esters
Glucocorticoids